Hypolycaena liara, the black-patch hairstreak, is a butterfly in the family Lycaenidae. The species was first described by Hamilton Herbert Druce in 1890. It is found in Guinea, Liberia, Ivory Coast, Ghana, Togo, Nigeria, Cameroon, Equatorial Guinea, the Democratic Republic of the Congo, Sudan, Uganda, Somalia, Kenya, Tanzania and Zambia. The habitat consists of forests and secondary growth.

The larvae feed on Vitex species.

Subspecies
Hypolycaena liara liara (eastern Guinea, Liberia, Ivory Coast, Ghana, Togo, Nigeria: south and the Cross River loop, Cameroon, Equatorial Guinea: Bioko, southern Sudan, Uganda, Somalia, western Kenya, north-western Tanzania, Democratic Republic of the Congo: Mongala, Uele, Kivu, Tshopo, Kinshasa, Sankuru, Lomani, Lualuba and Tanganika)
Hypolycaena liara plana Talbot, 1935 (Democratic Republic of the Congo: Shaba, south-western Tanzania, Zambia: Lusaka and northwards)

References

External links

Die Gross-Schmetterlinge der Erde 13: Die Afrikanischen Tagfalter. Plate XIII 67 a

Butterflies described in 1890
Hypolycaenini
Butterflies of Africa